Crybaby is the tenth studio album by Canadian indie pop duo Tegan and Sara, released via Mom + Pop Music on October 21, 2022. It is their first full-length studio album release since 2019's Hey, I'm Just Like You.

Background
Tegan and Sara wrote the majority of the songs for the album in 2020, during the COVID-19 pandemic.

In 2021, during production and script writing for the then-upcoming TV series High School, based on their 2019 memoir of the same name, Tegan and Sara entered the studio with producer John Congleton to record demos of "I Can't Grow Up" and "All I Wanted". The songs were initially intended as standalone singles, but during the first day of recording with Congleton, the duo became inspired to pivot the one-off studio session into the creation of their tenth studio album.

Promotion
Tegan and Sara announced the album on July 12, 2022.
On September 7, 2022, the duo appeared on Late Night with Seth Meyers, where they were interviewed about their TV show High School and the then-upcoming album, Crybaby. They performed the single "Yellow" live on the show.

On October 27, 2022, Tegan and Sara were musical guests on the Tonight Show Starring Jimmy Fallon, performing the single "I Can't Grow Up" live.

Track listing

Personnel
Tegan and Sara
 Tegan Quin – vocals, guitar, production
 Sara Quin – vocals, guitar, keyboards, sampling, production

Additional personnel
 John Congleton – production, mixing, engineering, bass, drum programming, guitar, keyboards
 Joey Waronker – drums, percussion
 Luke Reynolds – bass, guitar, keyboards
 Emily Lazar – mastering
 Chris Allgood – mastering
 Emy Storey – art direction, design, photography
 Becca McFarlane – design, photography
 Pamela Littky – photography

Charts

References

2022 albums
Tegan and Sara albums
Mom + Pop Music albums